A keogram ("keo" from "Keoeeit" – Inuit word for "Aurora Borealis") is a way of displaying the intensity of an auroral display, taken from a narrow part of a round screen recorded by a camera, more specifically and ideally in practice a "whole sky camera". These images from the narrow band, which usually face up in the north-south orientation in the Northern Hemisphere and the south-north orientation in the Southern Hemisphere, are collected and form a time-dependent graph of the aurora from that part of the sky. This allows one to easily realize the general activity of the display that night, whether it had been interrupted by weather conditions or not, and allows the determination of the regions in which the aurora was seen in terms of latitude and longitude of the area.

The use of keograms started in the 1970s by Eather et al. to allow a more practical and efficient way of determining the activity of the aurora throughout the recorded night and provide a view of the detailed movements of it, the light of which is also recorded in wavelengths outside of the human visible spectrum.
Thus, keograms are also used to analyse the conditions of the equatorial plasma bubbles (EPB) in the ionosphere of the Earth, to estimate its zonal drift at lower latitudes.

See also 
 Aurora
 Night sky

References 

Meteorological instrumentation and equipment
Atmospheric optical phenomena